Richard Giles Stilwell (February 24, 1917 – December 25, 1991) was a United States Army general who served as Commander United States Forces Korea from 1973 to 1976, and acting Commander of the U.S. Army Pacific from September to December 1974.  He was not closely related to General Joseph W. Stilwell.

Early life and education
Born in Buffalo, New York, in 1917, Stilwell attended Brown University before graduating from the United States Military Academy in 1938 with a commission into the Corps of Engineers. He subsequently attended the U.S. Army War College.

Career

World War II
During World War II, Stilwell participated in the Normandy invasion, and briefly served under General Patton immediately after the war during the occupation of Europe. From there he was a special military advisor to the U.S. Embassy in Rome before serving in the Central Intelligence Agency.

Cold War
Major commands for Stilwell included Commander of the U.S. Military Assistance Command, Thailand (MACTHAI) from 1965 to 1967. From there he commanded the 1st Armored Division at Fort Hood, Texas, from 1967 to 1968. After his return to Vietnam, Stilwell commanded the XXIV Corps from 1968 to 1969.

Korean War
During the Korean War, Stilwell commanded the 15th Infantry Regiment, and was a senior advisor to the I Republic of Korea (ROK) Army Corps. In Vietnam, General Westmoreland appointed Stilwell as his Chief of Staff.

West Point
As a brigadier general, Stilwell was Commandant of Cadets at the U.S. Military Academy at West Point, N.Y. while General Westmoreland was Superintendent during the early 1960s.

Vietnam War
Other significant assignments for Stilwell were Deputy Commanding General, III Marine Amphibious Force in Vietnam during 1968, and Deputy Chief of Staff for US Military Operations at the Pentagon under Army Chief of Staff General Westmoreland, 1969–1972. His major awards include the Distinguished Service Medal, the Silver Star, the Legion of Merit, the Distinguished Flying Cross, the Bronze Star, the Purple Heart, and numerous foreign decorations.

South Korea
Stilwell later served as the Commanding General of the Sixth United States Army, at the Presidio from 1972 to 1973, followed by Commander-in-Chief of the United Nations Command in Korea.  Stilwell oversaw Operation Paul Bunyan to remove a tree in the DMZ.

Later life and death
After retiring from the army, Stilwell served as U.S. Deputy Undersecretary of Defense for Policy from 1981 to 1985.

References

1917 births
1991 deaths
United States Army personnel of World War II
United States Army personnel of the Korean War
United States Army personnel of the Vietnam War
Recipients of the Legion of Merit
Recipients of the Distinguished Flying Cross (United States)
Recipients of the Silver Star
Military personnel from Buffalo, New York
United States Army generals
United States Military Academy alumni
Commanders, United States Forces Korea